Fermin Espinosa (born 7 July 1940) is a Cuban boxer. He competed at the 1964 Summer Olympics and the 1968 Summer Olympics. At the 1964 Summer Olympics, he defeated William Booth and Arnulfo Torrevillas, before losing to Chung Shin-cho.

References

External links
 

1940 births
Living people
Cuban male boxers
Olympic boxers of Cuba
Boxers at the 1964 Summer Olympics
Boxers at the 1968 Summer Olympics
Boxers from Havana
Pan American Games medalists in boxing
Pan American Games silver medalists for Cuba
Boxers at the 1967 Pan American Games
Bantamweight boxers
Medalists at the 1967 Pan American Games
20th-century Cuban people